The Geophilidae are a polyphyletic, cosmopolitan family of soil centipedes in the superfamily Geophiloidea containing the mostly defunct clades Aphilodontidae, Dignathodontidae, Linotaeniidae, Chilenophilinae, and Macronicophilidae.

Description
Species in this family are characterized by mandibles with a single pectinate lamella, slender antennae, sternal pores with variable arrangement, a generally slightly or moderately elongate head, frequently undivided coxosternite with two paramedian sclerotized lines, claws without rows of filament, and female gonopods usually being an undivided lamina.

Compared to most other families in the suborder Adesmata, this family features a modest number of leg-bearing segments and limited variation in this number within each species. Two species in this family include centipedes with only 29 pairs of legs: Geophilus persephones (29 pairs in the only specimen, a male), and G. richardi (29 or 31 pairs in males and 33 pairs in females). In the order Geophilomorpha, only two species include centipedes with fewer leg pairs, both of them in the family Schendylidae. Only a few geophilid species have more than 90 leg-bearing segments, including Ribautia taeniata, with 105 to 121 leg pairs in males and 111 to 125 pairs in females.

Genera
This family contains these genera:

Abatorus
Acanthogeophilus
Achilophilus
Agathothus
Agnathodon
Algerophilus
Alloschizotaenia
Aphilodon
Apogeophilus
Arctogeophilus
Arenophilus
Aztekophilus
Barrophilus
Bebekium
Bithyniphilus
Brachygeophilus
Brachygonarea
Caliphilus
Cephalodolichus
Cheiletha
Chileana
Chilenophilus
Chomatophilus
Clinopodes
Condylona
Damothus
Dekanphilus
Dignathodon
Diphyonyx
Dyodesmophilus
Dysmesus
Ecuadoron
Endogeophilus
Eremerium
Eremorus
Erithophilus
Eurygeophilus
Eurytion
Fagetophilus
Filipponus
Galliophilus
Garrina
Geomerinus
Geoperingueyia
Geophilus
Gnathoribautia
Gosipina
Hapleurytion
Harmostela
Harpacticellus
Henia
Horonia
Hovanyx
Hyphydrophilus
Ketampa
Kurdistanius
Lionyx
Macronicophilus
Maoriella
Mecistauchenus
Mecophilus
Mixophilus
Nabocodes
Nannocrix
Navajona
Nesidiphilus
Nesomerium
Nicopus
Nothogeophilus
Oligna
Orinomerium
Ortognathus
Pachymerellus
Pachymerinus
Pachymerium
Pagotaenia
Pandineum
Peruphilus
Philacroterium
Plestophilus
Plateurytion
Pleurogeophilus
Poaphilus
Polycricus
Polygonarea
Porethus
Portoricellus
Portoricona
Proschizotaenia
Pseudofagetophilus
Purcellinus
Pycnona
Queenslandophilus
Ribautia
Schendyloides
Schizonampa
Schizonium
Schizopleres
Schizotaenia
Sepedonophilus
Serrona
Sogona
Steneurytion
Stenotaenia
Strigamia
Stylolaemus
Sundageophilus
Synerium
Synthophilus
Taiyuna
Taschkentia
Telocricus
Timpina
Tretechthus
Tuoba
Tylonyx
Watophilus
Zantaenia
Zygona
Zygophilus

References

Centipede families
Geophilomorpha